Dechloromonas hortensis is a gram negative, facultatively anaerobic, (per)chlorate-reducing, motile bacterium from the genus of Dechloromonas.

References

External links
Type strain of Dechloromonas hortensis at BacDive -  the Bacterial Diversity Metadatabase

Rhodocyclaceae
Bacteria described in 2005